Giorgi Kharabadze (born 11 May 1997) is a Georgian boxer. He competed in the men's middleweight event at the 2020 Summer Olympics.

References

External links
 

1997 births
Living people
Male boxers from Georgia (country)
Olympic boxers of Georgia (country)
Boxers at the 2020 Summer Olympics
Sportspeople from Kutaisi
Boxers at the 2014 Summer Youth Olympics
European Games competitors for Georgia (country)
Boxers at the 2019 European Games
21st-century people from Georgia (country)